Daryl Sattler (born September 5, 1980 in Miami, Florida) is an American soccer player.

Career

College
Sattler played college soccer at Western Kentucky University where he started in the net all four years. He currently holds the WKU school record for career shutouts with 19.5, served as team captain and was named team MVP in 2002 and 2003, was named to the Missouri Valley Conference the MVC All-Freshman Team and to the All-Tournament Second Team in as a senior in 2003.   After Graduating college, Sattler turned down a USL pro soccer contract and focused his sites on coaching the game while he played for the local Nashville Metros.   In Fall of 2004 Sattler became the Assistant Men's Soccer Coach & Head Goalkeeper Coach for NCAA Division I  David Lipscomb University in the Sun Belt Conference.   In 2006, he moved to Jacksonville University to be the Assistant Men's Soccer Coach & Head Goalkeeper for the JU Dolphins also in the Sun Belt Conference.

Professional

Sattler turned professional in 2003 with the Nashville Metros, and was the team's first-choice goalkeeper for 2003, 2004 and 2006.  He spent the 2005 season with the Memphis Express. He made 89 saves during the 2006 season, and was ranked second in the league for saves. During his stint with the Metros he was named team MVP, and was a member of the All Southern Conference team in 2003.

Sattler moved to the Atlanta Silverbacks in the USL First Division in 2007 season, but never made a senior appearance for the team, spending his entire Silverbacks tenure as backup to first choice goalkeepers Ryan McIntosh and Felipe Quintero.

After Atlanta announced their season-long hiatus at the end of the 2008 season, Sattler moved to the Wilmington Hammerheads in 2009, and was the Hammerheads starting keeper until suffering a season-ending groin injury on July 17, 2009.

Sattler joined FC Tampa Bay of the North American Soccer League in 2010.  In January 2012 he signed with expansion side San Antonio Scorpions FC in the NASL who would go on to win the Regular Season Title in their Inaugural Season with Sattler as their starting GK, winning the NASL Golden Gloves Award.  He signed with expansion side Minnesota United FC in 2013, but was injured early in the season. In 2014, he re-signed with San Antonio and became NASL Champions.

Honors
2009 Wilmington Hammerheads 
   -USL-Div-2  Regular Season Champions
2010 Tampa Bay Rowdies 
   -USSF Div-2  Voted Team MVP & Best Defensive Player by Ralphs MOB (team supporters group)
2012 = San Antonio Scorpions 
   -NASL  Regular Season Champions  
   -NASL Golden Glove Award with 0.79 GAA in 24 games, 13 shutouts in League Play
2014-2015 = San Antonio Scorpions (NASL)
     - National Champions
___
2016-2017 = Jacksonville Armada FC
     - Head GK coach & Academy GK Director
2017–Present = EPIC Goalkeeping is born (EPICGK.com)
2018–Present = Flagler College 
      -2018 & 2019 Goalkeeper of the Year 
      -2019 Final Four Appearance 
      - 23-1-1 record (ranked #1 in nation)
2019–Present = Jacksonville FC 
      -Director of Goalkeeping

References

External links
 Wilmington Hammerheads bio

1980 births
Living people
American soccer players
Soccer players from Memphis, Tennessee
Atlanta Silverbacks players
Memphis Express (soccer) players
Nashville Metros players
Wilmington Hammerheads FC players
Tampa Bay Rowdies players
San Antonio Scorpions players
Minnesota United FC (2010–2016) players
USL League Two players
USL Second Division players
USSF Division 2 Professional League players
North American Soccer League players
Western Kentucky University alumni
Jacksonville Dolphins coaches
Sportspeople from Memphis, Tennessee
Association football goalkeepers